Selective mutism (SM) is an anxiety disorder in which a person who is otherwise capable of speech becomes unable to speak when exposed to specific situations, specific places, or to specific people, one or multiple of which serving as triggers. This is caused by the freeze response. Selective mutism usually co-exists with social anxiety disorder. People with selective mutism stay silent even when the consequences of their silence include shame, social ostracism, or punishment.

Signs and symptoms

Children and adults with selective mutism are fully capable of speech and understanding language but are completely unable to speak in certain situations, though speech is expected of them. The behaviour may be perceived as shyness or rudeness by others. A child with selective mutism may be completely silent at school for years but speak quite freely or even excessively at home. There is a hierarchical variation among people with this disorder: some people participate fully in activities and appear social but do not speak, others will speak only to peers but not to adults, others will speak to adults when asked questions requiring short answers but never to peers, and still others speak to no one and participate in few, if any, activities presented to them. In a severe form known as "progressive mutism", the disorder progresses until the person with this condition no longer speaks to anyone in any situation, even close family members.

To meet DSM-5 criteria for selective mutism, one must exhibit the following:

 Consistent failure to speak in specific social situations (in which there is an expectation for speaking, e.g., at school) despite speaking in other situations.
 The disturbance interferes with educational or occupational achievement or with social communication.
 The duration of the disturbance is at least 1 month (not limited to the first month of school).
 The failure to speak is not due to a lack of knowledge of the spoken language required in the social situation.
 The disturbance is not better accounted for by a communication disorder (e.g., childhood-onset fluency disorder) and does not occur exclusively in people with autism spectrum disorders or psychotic disorders such as schizophrenia.

Selective mutism is strongly associated with other anxiety disorders, particularly social anxiety disorder. In fact, the majority of children diagnosed with selective mutism also have social anxiety disorder (100% of participants in two studies and 97% in another). Some researchers therefore speculate that selective mutism may be an avoidance strategy used by a subgroup of children with social anxiety disorder to reduce their distress in social situations.

Particularly in young children, selective mutism can sometimes be confused with an autism spectrum disorder, especially if the child acts particularly withdrawn around their diagnostician, which can lead to incorrect diagnosis and treatment. Although autistic people may also be selectively mute, they often display other behaviors—stimming, repetitive behaviors, social isolation even among family members (not always answering to name, for example)—that set them apart from a child with selective mutism. Some autistic people may be selectively mute due to anxiety in unfamiliar social situations. If mutism is entirely due to autism spectrum disorder, it cannot be diagnosed as selective mutism as stated in the last item on the list above.

The former name elective mutism indicates a widespread misconception among psychologists that selective mute people choose to be silent in certain situations, while the truth is that they often wish to speak but are unable to do so. To reflect the involuntary nature of this disorder, the name was changed to selective mutism in 1994.

The incidence of selective mutism is not certain. Due to the poor understanding of this condition by the general public, many cases are likely undiagnosed. Based on the number of reported cases, the figure is commonly estimated to be 1 in 1000, 0.1%. However, a 2002 study in The Journal of the American Academy of Child and Adolescent Psychiatry estimated the incidence to be 0.71%.

Other symptoms
Besides lack of speech, other common behaviors and characteristics displayed by selectively mute people, according to Dr. Elisa Shipon-Blum's findings, include:

 Shyness, social anxiety, fear of social embarrassment or social isolation and withdrawal
 Difficulty maintaining eye contact
 Blank expression and reluctance to smile or incessant smiling 
 Difficulty expressing feelings, even to family members
 Tendency to worry more than most people of the same age
 Sensitivity to noise and crowds

On the flip side, there are some positive traits observed in many cases:

 Above average intelligence, inquisitiveness, or perception
 A strong sense of right and wrong
 Creativity
 Love for the arts
 Empathy
 Sensitivity for other people

Causes

Selective mutism (SM) is an umbrella term for the condition of otherwise well-developed children or adults who cannot speak or communicate under certain settings. The exact causes that affect each person may be different and yet unknown. There have been attempts to categorize, but there are no definitive answers yet due to the under-diagnosis and small/biased sample sizes. Many people are not diagnosed until late in childhood only because they do not speak at school and therefore fail to accomplish assignments requiring public speaking. Their involuntary silence makes the condition harder to understand or test. Parents often are unaware of the condition since the children may be functioning well at home. Teachers and pediatricians also sometimes mistake it for severe shyness or common stage fright.

Most children and adults with selective mutism are hypothesized to have an inherited predisposition to anxiety. They often have inhibited temperaments, which is hypothesized to be the result of over-excitability of the area of the brain called the amygdala. This area receives indications of possible threats and sets off the fight-or-flight response. Behavioral inhibitions, or inhibited temperaments, encompass feelings of emotional distress and social withdrawals. In a 2016 study, the relationship between behavioral inhibition and selective mutism was investigated. Children between the ages of three and 19 with lifetime selective mutism, social phobia, internalizing behavior, and healthy controls were assessed using the parent-rated Retrospective Infant Behavioral Inhibition (RIBI) questionnaire, consisting of 20 questions that addressed shyness and fear, as well as other subscales. The results indicated behavioral inhibition does indeed predispose selective mutism. Corresponding with the researchers’ hypothesis, children diagnosed with long-term selective mutism had a higher behavioral inhibition score as an infant. This is indicative of the positive correlation between behavioral inhibition and selective mutism.

Given the very high incidence of social anxiety disorder within selective mutism (as high as 100% in some studies), it is possible that social anxiety disorder causes selective mutism. Some children or adults with selective mutism may have trouble processing sensory information. This could cause anxiety and a sense of being overwhelmed in unfamiliar situations, which may cause the child or adult to "shut down" and not be able to speak (something that some autistic people also experience). Many children or adults with selective mutism have some auditory processing difficulties.

About 20–30% of children or adults with selective mutism have speech or language disorders that add stress to situations in which the child is expected to speak. In the DSM-4, the term “elective mutism” was changed to “selective mutism.” This name change intended to deemphasize this refusal and oppositional aspect of the disorder. Instead, it highlighted that in select environments, the child is unable to speak rather than choosing not to. In fact, children with selective mutism have a lower rate of oppositional behavior than their peers in a school setting. Some previous studies on the subject of selective mutism have been dismissed as containing serious flaws in their design. According to a more recent systematic study it is believed that children or adults who have selective mutism are not more likely than other children or adults to have a history of early trauma or stressful life events. Many children or adults who have selective mutism almost always speak confidently in some situations.

Treatment
Contrary to popular belief, people with selective mutism do not necessarily improve with age. Effective treatment is necessary for a child to develop properly. Without treatment, selective mutism can contribute to chronic depression, further anxiety, and other social and emotional problems.

Consequently, treatment at an early age is important. If not addressed, selective mutism tends to be self-reinforcing. Others may eventually expect an affected child to not speak and therefore stop attempting to initiate verbal contact. Alternatively, they may pressure the child to talk, increasing their anxiety levels in situations where speech is expected. Due to these problems, a change of environment may be a viable consideration. However, changing school is worth considering only if the alternative environment is highly supportive, otherwise a whole new environment could also be a social shock for the individual or deprive them of any friends or support they have currently. Regardless of the cause, increasing awareness and ensuring an accommodating, supportive environment are the first steps towards effective treatment. Most often affected children do not have to change schools or classes and have no difficulty keeping up except on the communication and social front. Treatment in teenage or adult years can be more difficult because the affected individual has become accustomed to being mute, and lacks social skills to respond to social cues.

The exact treatment depends on the person's age, any comorbid mental illnesses, and a number of other factors. For instance, stimulus fading is typically used with younger children because older children and teenagers recognize the situation as an attempt to make them speak, and older people with this condition and people with depression are more likely to need medication.

Like other disabilities, adequate accommodations are needed for those with the condition to succeed at school, work, and in the home. In the United States, under the Individuals with Disabilities Education Act (IDEA), a federal law, those with the disorder qualify for services based upon the fact that they have an impairment that hinders their ability to speak, thus disrupting their lives. This assistance is typically documented in the form of an Individualized Education Program (IEP). Post-secondary accommodations are also available for people with disabilities.

Under another law in the US, Section 504 of the Rehabilitation Act of 1973, public school districts are required to provide a free, appropriate public education to every "qualified handicapped person" residing within their jurisdiction. If the child is found to have impairments that substantially limit a major life activity (in this case, learning), the education agency has to decide what related aids or services are required to provide equal access to the learning environment.

Social Communication Anxiety Treatment (S-CAT) is a common treatment approach by professionals and has proven to be successful.  S-CAT integrates components of behavioral-therapy, cognitive-behavioral therapy (CBT), and an insight-oriented approach to increase social communication and promote social confidence. Tactics such as systemic desensitization, modeling, fading, and positive reinforcement enable individuals to develop social engagement skills and begin to progress communicatively in a step-by-step manner. There are many treatment plans that exist and it is recommended for families to do thorough research before deciding on their treatment approach.

Self-modeling
An affected child is brought into the classroom or the environment where the child will not speak and is videotaped. First, the teacher or another adult prompts the child with questions that likely will not be answered. A parent, or someone the child feels comfortable speaking to, then replaces the prompter and asks the child the same questions, this time eliciting a verbal response. The two videos of the conversations are then edited together to show the child directly answering the questions posed by the teacher or other adult. This video is then shown to the child over a series of several weeks, and every time the child sees themself verbally answering the teacher/other adult, the tape is stopped and the child is given positive reinforcement.

Such videos can also be shown to affected children's classmates to set an expectation in their peers that they can speak. The classmates thereby learn the sound of the child's voice and, albeit through editing, have the opportunity to see the child conversing with the teacher.

Mystery motivators
Mystery motivation is often paired with self-modeling. An envelope is placed in the child's classroom in a visible place. On the envelope, the child's name is written along with a question mark. Inside is an item that the child's parent has determined to be desirable to the child. The child is told that when they ask for the envelope loudly enough for the teacher and others in the classroom to hear, the child will receive the mystery motivator. The class is also told of the expectation that the child ask for the envelope loudly enough that the class can hear.

Stimulus fading
Affected subjects can be brought into a controlled environment with someone with whom they are at ease and can communicate. Gradually, another person is introduced into the situation. One example of stimulus fading is the sliding-in technique, where a new person is slowly brought into the talking group. This can take a long time for the first one or two faded-in people but may become faster as the patient gets more comfortable with the technique.

As an example, a child may be playing a board game with a family member in a classroom at school. Gradually, the teacher is brought in to play as well. When the child adjusts to the teacher's presence, then a peer is brought in to be a part of the game. Each person is only brought in if the child continues to engage verbally and positively.

Desensitization
The subject communicates indirectly with a person to whom they are afraid to speak through such means as email, instant messaging (text, audio or video), online chat, voice or video recordings, and speaking or whispering to an intermediary in the presence of the target person. This can make the subject more comfortable with the idea of communicating with this person.

Shaping
The subject is slowly encouraged to speak. The subject is reinforced first for interacting nonverbally, then for saying certain sounds (such as the sound that each letter of the alphabet makes) rather than words, then for whispering, and finally saying a word or more.

Spacing
Spacing is important to integrate, especially with self-modeling. Repeated and spaced out use of interventions is shown to be the most helpful long-term for learning. Viewing videotapes of self-modeling should be shown over a spaced out period of time of approximately 6 weeks.

Drug treatments
Some practitioners believe there would be evidence indicating anxiolytics to be helpful in treating children and adults with selective mutism, to decrease anxiety levels and thereby speed the process of therapy. Use of medication may end after nine to twelve months, once the person has learned skills to cope with anxiety and has become more comfortable in social situations. Medication is more often used for older children, teenagers, and adults whose anxiety has led to depression and other problems.

Medication, when used, should never be considered the entire treatment for a person with selective mutism. However, the reason why medication needs to be considered as a treatment at all is because selective mutism is still prevalent, despite psychosocial efforts. But while on medication, the person should still be in therapy to help them learn how to handle anxiety and prepare them for life without medication, as medication is typically a short-term solution.

Since selective mutism is categorized as an anxiety disorder, using similar medication to treat either makes sense. Antidepressants have been used in addition to self-modeling and mystery motivation to aid in the learning process. Furthermore, SSRIs in particular have been used to treat selective mutism. In a systematic review, ten studies were looked at which involved SSRI medications, and all reported medication was well tolerated. In one of them, Black and Uhde (1994) conducted a double-blind, placebo-controlled study investigating the effects of fluoxetine. By parent report, fluoxetine-treated children showed significantly greater improvement than placebo-treated children. In another, Dummit III et al. (1996) administered fluoxetine to 21 children for nine weeks and found that 76% of the children had reduced or no symptoms by the end of the experiment. This indicates that fluoxetine is an SSRI that is indeed helpful in treating selective mutism.

History
In 1877, German physician Adolph Kussmaul described children who were able to speak normally but often refused to as having a disorder he named aphasia voluntaria. Although this is now an obsolete term, it was part of an early effort to describe the concept now called selective mutism.

In 1980, a study by Torey Hayden identified what she called four "subtypes" of elective mutism (as it was called then), although this set of subtypes is not in current diagnostic use. These subtypes are no longer recognized, though "speech phobia" is sometimes used to describe a selectively mute person who appears not to have any symptoms of social anxiety.

The Diagnostic and Statistical Manual of Mental Disorders (DSM), first published in 1952, first included selective mutism in its third edition, published in 1980. Selective mutism was described as "a continuous refusal to speak in almost all social situations" despite normal ability to speak. While "excessive shyness" and other anxiety-related traits were listed as associated features, predisposing factors included "maternal overprotection", "mental retardation", and trauma. Elective mutism in the third edition revised (DSM III-R) is described similarly to the third edition except for specifying that the disorder is not related to social phobia.

In 1994, Sue Newman, co-founder of the Selective Mutism Foundation, requested that the fourth edition of the DSM reflect the name change from elective mutism to selective mutism and describe the disorder as a failure to speak. The relation to anxiety disorders was emphasized, particularly in the revised version (DSM IV-TR). As part of the reorganization of the DSM categories, the DSM-5 moved selective mutism from the section "Disorders Usually First Diagnosed in Infancy, Childhood, or Adolescence" to the section for anxiety disorders.

See also
 June and Jennifer Gibbons, the Silent Twins

Citations

Further reading

 McHolm, Angela E., Cunningham, Charles E., & Vanier, Melanie A. (2005). Helping Your Child with Selective Mutism. New Harbinger Publications, Inc. 

Anxiety disorders
Mental disorders diagnosed in childhood
Muteness